Myittha River is a river of western Burma, a tributary of the Chindwin River.

Course
The Myittha originates in the Chin Hills and flowing northwards drains the Kale Valley. It flows into the Chindwin, one of the main tributaries of the Irrawaddy River, on the right just below the town of Kalewa.

See also
List of rivers of Burma

References

Rivers of Myanmar